Yvette Kosmann-Schwarzbach (born 30 April 1941) is a French mathematician and professor. She has been teaching mathematics at the Lille University of Science and Technology and at the École polytechnique since 1993. Kosmann-Schwarzbach obtained her doctoral degree in 1970 at the University of Paris under supervision of André Lichnerowicz on a dissertation titled Dérivées de Lie des spineurs (Lie derivatives of spinors). She is the author of over fifty articles on differential geometry, algebra and mathematical physics, as well as the co-editor of several books concerning the theory of integrable systems. The Kosmann lift in differential geometry is named after her.

Works 
 Groups and Symmetries: From Finite Groups to Lie Groups. Translated by Stephanie Frank Singer. Springer 2010, .
 The Noether Theorems: Invariance and Conservation Laws in the Twentieth Century. Translated by Bertram Schwarzbach. Springer 2011, .

References 

French mathematicians
Women mathematicians
1941 births
Living people
Collège de France alumni
Academic staff of École Polytechnique
Academic staff of the Lille University of Science and Technology